Fotios Vasilopoulos (alternative spellings: Fotis, Vassilopoulos) (born 1986) is a Greek professional basketball player who plays for Ethnikos Piraeus B.C. of the Greek B Basket League. He is 1.87 m (6' 1") tall, and he plays at the point guard position.

Professional career
Vasilopoulos started his career with Panionios (2002–04). Then he played for AGE Halkida (2004–05) in the Greek 2nd Division. He then moved back to Panionios (2005–07), before returning to AGE Halkida (2007–08).

He then played with AEK Athens in 2008–09, and then with Dafni (2009–10), and Pagrati (2010–11), before returning again to AEK Athens for the 2011–12 season. Vasilopoulos returned to Pagrati, and he finished first in the Greek 2nd Division in assists, and fourth in points, during the 2013–14 season. In August 2014, Vasilopoulos joined Panelefsiniakos of the Greek Basket League.

For the 2015–16 season, Vasilopoulos played with Ethnikos Piraeus, in the Greek 2nd Division. In September 2016, Vasilopoulos joined Faros Keratsiniou. In 2017, he joined the Greek 3rd Division club Ionikos Nikaias.

For the 2022–23 season, he returned to Ethnikos Piraeus for a third spell at the club.

National team career
Vasilopoulos was a member of the junior national teams of Greece. With Greece's junior national teams, he played at both the 2004 FIBA Europe Under-18 Championship and the 2005 FIBA Europe Under-20 Championship.

References

External links
EuroCup Profile
FIBA.com Profile
FIBA Europe Profile
Eurobasket.com Profile
AEK.com Profile

1986 births
Living people
AEK B.C. players
AGEH Gymnastikos B.C. players
Charilaos Trikoupis B.C. players
Dafnis B.C. players
Ethnikos Piraeus B.C. players
Faros Keratsiniou B.C. players
Greek men's basketball players
Greek Basket League players
Ionikos Nikaias B.C. players
Pagrati B.C. players
Panelefsiniakos B.C. players
Panionios B.C. players
Point guards
Basketball players from Athens